The electricity sector in Switzerland relies mainly on hydroelectricity, since the Alps cover almost two-thirds of the country's land mass, providing many large mountain lakes and artificial reservoirs suited for hydro power. In addition, the water masses drained from the Swiss Alps are intensively used by run-of-the-river hydroelectricity (ROR). With 9,052 kWh per person in 2008, the country's electricity consumption is relatively high and was 22% above the European Union's average.

In 2013, net generated electricity amounted to 66.2 terawatt-hours (TWh). About 60% of Switzerland's electricity generation comes from renewable sources, most of it from hydro (56.6%), while non-hydro renewables supplied a small contribution of 3.4%. Nuclear contributed 37.6% to the country's electricity production and only about 2.5% were generated by fossil fuel based thermal power stations.

Consumption 

According to IEA the electricity use (gross production + imports – exports – transmission/distribution losses) in Switzerland was in 2004 60.6 TWh, (2007) 61.6 TWh and (2008) 63.5 TWh.  In 2008 Switzerland consumed electricity per inhabitant 122% compared to the European Union 15 average (9,052  / EU15: 7,409 electricity use per inhabitant 2008, kWh/person)  and 133% compared to the United Kingdom (2008: UK 372.19 TWh per 59.9milj. person and Switzerland 63,53 TWh per 7,71 milj.person).

Hydro power 

Hydroelectricity is by far the country's most important source of electricity, and contributing more than half to its electricity generation. Hydro power is generally divided into conventional hydroelectricity (using a dam) and run-of-the-river hydroelectricity. In addition, pumped-storage hydroelectricity (PSH) plays an important role in Switzerland, being used in combination with base load power plants and to green-washing nuclear power from France.

Small hydro 

The KEV remuneration (see below) also applies to small-scale hydro power plants with nameplate capacities up to 10 megawatts.

Nuclear power 

There are four nuclear power plants, with a total of five operational reactors. In 2013, they produced 24.8 terawatt-hours (TWh) of electricity. Nuclear power accounted for 36.4% of the nation's gross electricity generation of 68.3 TWh 
In addition, there are a number of research reactors in Switzerland, one of them at the EPFL.

In 2011, the federal authorities decided to gradually phase out nuclear power in Switzerland as a consequence of the Fukushima accident in Japan. In late 2013 the operator BKW decided to cease all electrical generation in 2019 in the Mühleberg plant

As of December 8, 2014, the National Council has voted to limit the operational life-time of the Beznau Nuclear Power Plant—which houses the oldest commercial reactor in the world—to 60 years, forcing decommissioning upon its two reactors by 2029 and 2031, respectively.

Oil power 
From 1965 until 1999, the Chavalon plant in Valais, above the Collombey refinery, had an electrical power output of two times 142 megawatts. The refinery was shut down in 2015, and will be dismantled until 2022.

Gas power 
A newly built gas power plant is debated to cover future power shortages during the winter. There are considerations regarding a gas turbine testing facility in Birr AG belonging to the Italian engineering firm Ansaldo Energia. The facility is connected to both the gas and the electricity grid, and when both installed turbines are running, it feeds 740 megawatts into the Swiss electricity grid.

Non-hydro renewables

Feed-in remuneration at cost (KEV)

The federal government adopted feed-in tariffs to offer a cost-based compensation to renewable energy producers. The feed-in remuneration at cost (KEV) is the primary instrument for promoting the deployment of power systems using renewable energy sources.

It covers the difference between the production and the market price, and guarantees producers of electricity from renewable sources a price that corresponds to their production costs. The following renewable energy sources are supported by the KEV remuneration: distributed small hydro (with capacities up to 10 MW), solar photovoltaics, wind power, geothermal energy, biomass and biogas (from agriculture, waste and water treatment).

The KEV remuneration is financed by collecting a surcharge on the consumed kilowatt-hour of electricity. As in other countries, industries with a large electricity consumption are exempt from the surcharge, which has gradually been increased and stands at 1.5 cents per kWh as of 2014.

The remuneration tariffs for renewables have been specified based on reference power plants for each individual technology. Feed-in tariffs are applicable for 20 to 25 years, depending on the technology. In view of the anticipated technological progress and the increasing degree of market maturity of renewables energy technologies (especially for solar PV), the feed-in tariffs are subjected to a gradual reduction once or twice a year. These reductions only apply to new production facilities that are put into operation.

Planned installations of renewable power facilities have to be registered with Swissgrid, the national network operator. As of the end of 2014, a growing waiting list for solar photovoltaic systems has accumulated as demand excess the capped capacities given by the currently available funds of the KEV remuneration.

Wind power 

Swiss wind power accounted for only 146 GWh or 0.2% of net-electricity production in 2019.

Solar power 

For many years, Switzerland's pace of deploying solar PV had been lagging significantly behind its neighboring Germany and Italy. However, installed capacity of solar PV increased by 300 MW or 69% to 737 MW in 2013 and is likely to continue its strong growth due to the recently ramped up KEV funds. In 2014, another installed 320 MW brought the country beyond the gigawatt mark and the IEA-PVPS estimates the now installed capacity sufficient to supply close to 2% of the domestic electricity demands.

Geothermal power 

An induced seismicity in Basel led the city to suspend a geothermal energy project and conduct a seismic hazard evaluation, which resulted in its cancellation in December 2009.

Global warming 

Emissions of carbon dioxide in total, per capita in 2007 were 5.6 tons CO2 compared to EU 27 average 7.9 tons CO2.

Carbon dioxide emissions 

A study published in 2009 showed that the emissions of carbon dioxide due to the electricity consumed in Switzerland (total: 5.7 million tonnes) are seven times higher than the emissions of carbon dioxide due to the electricity produced in Switzerland (total: 0.8 million tonnes).

The study also show that the production in Switzerland (64.6 TWh) is similar to the amount of electricity consumed in the country (63.7 TWh).

Power stations

In Switzerland, there also exists a single-phase AC grid operated with 16.7 Hz for power supply of railway lines, see List of installations for 15 kV AC railway electrification in Germany, Austria and Switzerland.

Notes and references

See also
 Electric power transmission
 Nuclear power in Switzerland
 Energy in Switzerland